Tiny Toy Stories is a home video compilation of five computer-animated short films made by Pixar. It was released on October 29, 1996, by Walt Disney Home Video and Disney Videos internationally. The International releases, including the UK and Japan, have the Toy Story characters hosting it and talking about the shorts. Additionally, the international releases have Knick Knack and Tin Toy switched, to exemplify how "without Tin Toy, there would've been no Toy Story".

Shorts
All directed by John Lasseter except as noted:
The Adventures of André & Wally B. (1984), directed by Alvy Ray Smith
Luxo Jr. (1986) (original version)
Red's Dream (1987)
Tin Toy (1988)
Knick Knack (1989) (original version)

Cast
 Jeff Bennett as Rex
 Dee Bradley Baker as the Aliens
 Pat Fraley as Buzz Lightyear
 Jim Hanks as Woody
 John Ratzenberger as Hamm
 Tyler Mullen

Follow-ups
In November 2007, Walt Disney Studios Home Entertainment released Pixar Short Films Collection, Volume 1, which featured all of Pixar's animated short films up through 2006's Lifted. It also included The Adventures of André & Wally B. The second volume of shorts, Pixar Short Films Collection, Volume 2 was released in 2012.   The third volume of shorts, Pixar Short Films Collection, Volume 3 was released in 2018.

External links
Tiny Toy Stories on Archive

1996 direct-to-video films
1996 films
Pixar short films
Short film compilations
Disney home video releases
Animated anthology films
Films directed by Alvy Ray Smith
Films directed by John Lasseter
1990s American films